Croce may refer to:

 Croce (family), a noble family in the Republic of Ragusa
 Croce (genus), a genus of lacewings in the family Nemopteridae
 Croce (surname)
 Croce, Haute-Corse, a municipality in the Haute-Corse department, France
 Croce, a parish of Menaggio in the Province of Como, Italy

See also
Santa Croce (disambiguation)